Muvvala Vani Palem Colony, known as MVP Colony is an urban neighborhood in the Indian city of Visakhapatnam and is Asia's largest township with a population of more than 250,000. The colony is divided into 12 sectors.

It is a well-developed colony in Visakhapatnam with many hotels, restaurants, temples, parks, and also hospitals. A modern auditorium, an amphitheater and three convention halls worth  20 crore are being constructed here. The foundation stone for these was laid in February 2014.

A track was laid along the foothills of Kailasgiri called the VMRDA Health Arena or Buddha Vanam which was inaugurated in January 2016.  It was developed by VUDA after spending nearly ₹8 crores. Buddha Vanam with a 31-foot Buddha statue raised on a three-foot pedestal is an important attraction for tourists. Very quickly, it turned into a popular rendezvous for the health-conscious as well as tourists thronging the city for its impressive landscaping and magnificent grandeur. This is the only park in the city which has a long stretch for walking and cycling for which there is a dedicated track. The Buddha Vanam also attracts several women and senior citizens for meditation. Many visit the imposing statue area for yoga, Suryanamaskar, and laughing exercise.

Tenneti Park, which is at the intersection of Sector-9 and the beach road towards Bhimili (Marine drive), has views of the Bay of Bengal and the anchored ships in the harbor.  The Shivaji Park is located adjacent to the colony.

Transport

APS RTC operates bus services from MVP Colony bus station to every part of the city. MVP Double road and Beach road are major roads. The most important bus route is 540 which runs from MVP Complex to Simhachalam, 900 which runs from Maddilapalem to railway station via MVP Colony. 900K which runs from Bheemili to RTC Complex via MVP and Ushodaya Junction.

APSRTC routes

References

Neighbourhoods in Visakhapatnam